Lilo Raymond (1922–2009) was an American photographer.

Raymond fled Nazi Germany in 1938, settling in New York City. There, she took classes at the Photo League. Her work is included in the collections of the Smithsonian American Art Museum, the Metropolitan Museum of Art the Princeton University Art Museum, and the Getty Museum, Los Angeles

References

1922 births
2009 deaths
20th-century American photographers
21st-century American photographers
21st-century American women artists
American women photographers
Artists from Frankfurt
Emigrants from Nazi Germany to the United States
20th-century American women artists
Artists in the Smithsonian American Art Museum collection